Amphilius caudosignatus is a species of catfish in the genus Amphilius.

It is found in the southeastern tributaries of the Ogooué River in Gabon. The fish has six to seven principal caudal fin rays with a unique coloration consisting of distinct caudal fin colour patterns, dark brown with a white base and a broad oblique white band from mid dorsal to post ventral corner. It was first described by Paul Harvey Skelton in 2007.

References 

caudosignatus
Freshwater fish of Africa
Fish described in 2007